Shei Je Holud Pakhi is a musical thriller Bengali web series which was released on Bengali OTT platform hoichoi on 30 June 2018. The series was directed by Anirban Mallick who previously directed Hello and Eken Babu.

Through these web series, Tridha Choudhury who is best known for her role as Rini in director Srijit Mukherjee’s Mishawr Rawhoshyo also made her come back in Bengali entertainment industry after two years. In this web series, Tridha played the central character as Vaidehi. The series also stars Saswata Chatterjee as Shom.

The story centers around  Shom (Saswata Chatterjee) a police officer who lost his daughter Mitil five years ago.  Now he is trying to connect to his daughter through the lead singer of Band Euthanasia, Vaidehi (Tridha Choudhury). Vaidehi promises him that the last song of her concert will be Mitil's song but she breaks her promise and later goes out for her regular drive after the concert, and an agitated Shom follows her only to witness her car crash.  The media accuses Shom of her death.

The second Season of Shei Je Holud Pakhi (Shei Je Holud Pakhi 2) was released on 14 April 2021 on Hoichoi.

This is streaming on MX Player as Vaidehi in Hindi language.

Cast 
Tridha Choudhury as Vaidehi/Ida
Saswata Chatterjee as Inspector Somnath Maitra
Gourab Chatterjee as Dipto
Bidipta Chakraborty as Karuna, Vaidehi's mother.
Sudip Mukherjee as Commissioner of Police Sudeep Chatterjee 
Kaushik Sen as Diganto Basu (Season 2)
Rupanjana Mitra as Inspector Anuradha (Season 2)
Chandrayee Ghosh as Jonaki Ganguli (Season 2)
Prantik Banerjee as Rik Chatterjee (Season 2)
Somraj Maity as Onir
Indranil Mullick as Bingo
Angana Royy as Mitil
Debdut Ghosh as Pramatha Chowdhury
Arnab Banerjee as Birsa
Shoumo Banerjee as Inspector Kaushik
Manosi Sengupta as Suhina
Arunava Dey as Tito/Suman Debnath

Episodes

Season 1 (2018)
The first season of Shei Je Holud Pakhi started streaming on hoichoi on 30 June 2018 with 7 episodes.

Episodes

Season 2 (2021)
On 14 April 2021 hoichoi released the second season of the series with brand new eight episodes.

Episodes

References

External links

Indian web series
2017 web series debuts
Bengali-language web series
Hoichoi original programming